Abdelhak Mansour (born 4 March 1985) is an Algerian professional footballer. He currently plays as a defender for the Algerian Ligue 2 club CA Bordj Bou Arreridj.

References

External links
Lnf.dz

1985 births
Living people
Algerian footballers
CA Bordj Bou Arréridj players
USM Annaba players
Algerian Ligue Professionnelle 1 players
Algerian Ligue 2 players
Association football defenders
21st-century Algerian people